Clara Espar Llaquet (born 29 September 1994) is a Spanish water polo player who won the silver medal at the 2017 World Championships in Budapest and at the 2019 World Championships in Gwangju.

College career

Espar attended San Jose State University, playing on the women's water polo team from 2014 to 2015. She scored 96 goals as a freshman and 94 as a sophomore being the first player in San Jose State history to score at least one goal in every single match in a season.

International career
In 2018 she won the gold medal at Mediterranean Games in Tarragona and the bronze at European Championship in Barcelona.

Family
Espar's older sister, Anni, is also a professional water polo player.

See also
 List of World Aquatics Championships medalists in water polo

References

External links
 
 
 
 Interview with Clara Espar at BIWPA.com

1994 births
Living people
Water polo players from Barcelona
Spanish female water polo players
Water polo players at the 2016 Summer Olympics
Water polo players at the 2020 Summer Olympics
World Aquatics Championships medalists in water polo
Mediterranean Games medalists in water polo
Mediterranean Games gold medalists for Spain
Competitors at the 2018 Mediterranean Games
Medalists at the 2020 Summer Olympics
Olympic silver medalists for Spain in water polo
21st-century Spanish women
Sportswomen from Catalonia
San Jose State Spartans athletes
Spanish expatriate sportspeople in the United States
Expatriate water polo players